Lohner may refer to:

People with the surname
Danny Lohner (born 1970), American rock musician
Harold Lohner (born 1958), American designer
Helmuth Lohner (1933–2015), Austrian actor
Henning Lohner (born 1961), German film score composer
 (1821–1892), Austrian entrepreneur, founder of Lohner-Werke
Ludwig Lohner (1858–1925), Austrian entrepreneur, son of Jakob Lohner

Technology
Lohner-Werke, traditional Austro-Hungarian coach, car and aircraft manufacturer in Vienna, today Bombardier Wien Schienenfahrzeuge
Lohner–Porsche, an early (1900s) hybrid vehicle

Geography
Lohner (mountain), a Swiss mountain

See also